Seugy is a railway station in Seugy, Val d'Oise department, France. The station is served by the Transilien H trains from Paris to Luzarches. In 2002 fewer than 500 passengers per day joined a train here.

References

External links
 

Railway stations in Val-d'Oise
Railway stations in France opened in 1893